Baron O'Hagan, of Tullahogue in the County of Tyrone, is a title in the Peerage of the United Kingdom. It was created on 14 June 1870 for Sir Thomas O'Hagan, then Lord Chancellor of Ireland. His younger son, the third Baron, served as a Lord-in-waiting (government whip in the House of Lords) from 1907 to 1910 in the Liberal administrations of Sir Henry Campbell-Bannerman and H. H. Asquith and was later a Deputy Speaker of the House of Lords. In 1909 Lord O'Hagan assumed by Royal licence the additional surname of Towneley, which was that of his maternal grandfather.  the title is held by his grandson, the fourth Baron, who succeeded in 1961. He is the son of the Hon. Thomas Anthony Edward Towneley Strachey (d. 1955). Lord O'Hagan was a Member of the European Parliament for Devon from 1973 to 1975 and again from 1979 to 1994, first as an independent and later as a Conservative. He assumed in 1938 by deed poll the additional Christian name of Towneley and the surname of Strachey in lieu of his patronymic. Strachey was the surname of his maternal grandfather Edward Strachey, 1st Baron Strachie.

Barons O'Hagan (1870)
Thomas O'Hagan, 1st Baron O'Hagan (1812–1885)
Thomas Towneley O'Hagan, 2nd Baron O'Hagan (1878–1900)
Maurice Herbert Towneley Towneley-O'Hagan, 3rd Baron O'Hagan (1882–1961)
Charles Towneley Strachey, 4th Baron O'Hagan (b. 1945)

The heir presumptive is his younger brother Hon. Richard Towneley Strachey (b. 1950)
The heir presumptive's heir apparent is his son Columba Strachey (b. 1985)

References

Baronies in the Peerage of the United Kingdom
Noble titles created in 1870
Noble titles created for UK MPs